Myagdi District, a part of Gandaki Province, is one of the seventy-seven districts of Nepal.

Geography and climate
This district can experience 7 types of climates

Demographics

At the time of the 2011 Nepal census, Myagdi District had a population of 113,641. Of these, 94.4% spoke Nepali, 2.2% Magar, 1.0% Kham, 0.9% Chhantyal, 0.6% Newari, 0.1% Bhojpuri, 0.1% Gurung, 0.1% Hindi, 0.1% Maithili, 0.1% Sanskrit, 0.1% Sign language, 0.1% Thakali and 0.2% other languages as their first language.

In terms of ethnicity/caste, 39.6% were Magar, 17.0% Chhetri, 15.4% Kami, 8.0% Hill Brahmin, 5.8% Damai/Dholi, 3.5% Chhantyal, 3.4% Sarki, 2.0% Thakuri, 1.3% Newar, 1.0% Gurung, 0.9% Thakali, 0.5% Kisan, 0.2% Sanyasi/Dasnami, 0.2% Tamang, 0.1% Badi, 0.1% other Dalit, 0.1% Musalman, 0.1% Rai and 0.3% others.

In terms of religion, 87.2% were Hindu, 10.3% Buddhist, 1.3% Christian, 0.8% Prakriti, 0.2% Muslim and 0.2% others.

In terms of literacy, 71.5% could read and write, 2.3% could only read and 26.1% could neither read nor write.

Administration
The district consists of 6 Municipalities, out of which one is an urban municipality and five are rural municipalities. These are as follows:
Beni Municipality
Annapurna Rural Municipality
Dhaulagiri Rural Municipality
Mangala Rural Municipality
Malika Rural Municipality
Raghuganga Rural Municipality

Former Village Development Committees 
Prior to the restructuring of the district, Myagdi District consisted of the following municipalities and Village development committees:

Arman
Arthunge
Baadook
Babiyachaur
Baranja
Begkhola
Beni Municipality
Bhakilmi
Bhanbare
Bima
Chimkhola
Dagnam
Dana
Darwang
Devisthan
Doba
Ghar
Ghatan
Gurja Khani
Histhan Mandali
Jhin
Jyamrukot
Khibang
Kuhunkot
Kuinemangale
Lulang
Malkwang
Marang
Mudi
Muna
Nangi
Narchyang
Niskot
Okharbot
Pakhapani
Patlekhet
Pulachaur
Rakhu Bhagawati
Rakhupiple
Ramche
Ratnechaur
Shikha
Singa
Takam
Tatopani
Ruma

Notable people
Min Bahadur Sherchan, who was the oldest man to summit Mount Everest for about 5 years, was born in Myagdi district of Nepal was born here.
Nirmal Purja , a mountaineer and former Gurkha and Special Boat Service (SBS) soldier.
Mahabir Pun, Man who provided internet to remote villages and Leader Of National Innovation Center.

Infrastructures
Tatopani Hydropower Station (2 MW)

See also
Zones of Nepal

References

 
Districts of Nepal established in 1962
Gandaki Province